Juha Holopainen (born 4 September 1970) is a Finnish freestyle skier. He competed in the men's moguls event at the 1994 Winter Olympics.

References

External links
 

1970 births
Living people
Finnish male freestyle skiers
Olympic freestyle skiers of Finland
Freestyle skiers at the 1994 Winter Olympics
People from Nurmes
Sportspeople from North Karelia